Nazzab Hidzan (born 24 March 1975) is a Malaysian former professional football player.

A midfield playmaker in his playing days, he is commonly associated with Selangor FA where he played for 8 years during his career, winning 2 Malaysia Cups (1997 and 2005), Malaysia Premier League One championship (the top league, same level as current Malaysia Super League) in 2000, and Malaysia Premier League championship (the second level league) in 2005. He also played for Telekom Melaka, where he won Premier League Group B championship in 2004, and also played for Negeri Sembilan FA and Perlis FA.

He also played for Malaysia national football team, debuting in a friendly match against China national football team in 1998 under coach Hatem Souissi. This is currently his only known appearance for the national team.

Currently he can be seen at Malaysia satellite channel Astro Arena, as a co-commentator and football pundit for football games broadcast on the channel with Hasnizam Uzir, Azlan Johar, Asmawi Bakiri and Stanley Bernard.

References

External links
 

Living people
Malaysian people of Malay descent
Malaysian footballers
Malaysia international footballers
1975 births
Negeri Sembilan FA players
Selangor FA players
Perlis FA players
People from Selangor
Association football midfielders